Fah Krajang Dao is 2012 Thai drama that stars Pakorn Chatborirak and Peeranee Kongthai in Channel 3.

Synopsis
Mee (Peeranee Kongthai) has a messed up past since her father doesn't want to take responsibility of her mother when her mother was pregnant at the age of 15, so she was raised by her aunt. Because of her aunt being so strict she ran off in order to find her mother in Northern part of Thailand, however her life there became miserable since she encounters an abusive stepfather who is involved in human trafficking, but her helpless mother couldn't stop her evil stepfather.

Cast
Pakorn Chatborirak as Hiran
Peeranee Kongthai as Meekana "Mee"
Urassaya Sperbund as Mattana "Matt"
Atichart Chumnanon as Khettawan "Tawan"
Rasri Balenciaga as Sarawaree "Waree"
Chakrit Yamnam as Samah

References

Thai television soap operas
2012 Thai television series debuts
2010s Thai television series
Channel 3 (Thailand) original programming